Wuthering Heights is a 1978 British film adaptation of Emily Brontë's 1847 novel Wuthering Heights, starring Ken Hutchison, Kay Adshead, Pat Heywood, and John Duttine, originally broadcast on BBC Two as a 5-part mini-series, beginning 24 September 1978. Location filming took place on the Yorkshire Moors. This BBC version is regarded as being the one most faithful to the original novel because it does not end with Cathy's death but continues into the next generation, with Heathcliff seeking revenge against those he felt had wronged him.

Plot summary

Cast

 Heathcliff – 	Ken Hutchison
 Cathy – 	Kay Adshead
 Joseph – 	Brian Wilde
 Ellen Dean –	Pat Heywood
 Hindley – 	John Duttine
 Frances – 	 Maggie Wilkinson
 Mr Linton – 	Dennis Burgess
 Mrs Linton – 	 Wendy Williams
 Lockwood – 	Richard Kay
 Mr Earnshaw – 	John Collin
 Mrs Earnshaw – 	Patricia Healey
 Servant Girl – 	Judith Byfield
 Dr Kenneth – 	John Golightly
 Edgar – 	David Robb
 Reverend Graham – 	Paul Dawkins
 Isabella – 	Caroline Langrishe
 Mr Green – 	Norman Rutherford
 Zillah – 	Barbara Keogh
 Catherine Linton – 	Cathryn Harrison
 Hareton – 	David Wilkinson
 Linton – 	Andrew Burleigh
 Mary – 	Kate David
 Robert – 	Barry Hart
 Sexton – 	Charles Turner
 Small Boy – 	Richard Usher
 Heathcliff (as child) – 	Dale Tarry
 Cathy (as child) –	Maria Swailes
 Hindley (as child) – 	Mitchell Varnam
 Edgar (as child) – 	Grant Bardsley
 Isabella (as child) – 	Julia Stark
 Hareton (as child) – 	Elliot Moss
 Hareton (as child) – 	Simon Massey

Critical reception
Allmovie wrote, "Irish playwright Hugh Leonard handles the adaptation, deftly juggling the many characters and subplots without the slightest sense of strain"; and the BFI described the adaptation as "embracing the hysteria and savagery of its source novel."  However, in a contemporary review Clive James called it "[t]he latest but not the best of the Beeb's long line of classic serials", and "the blithering pits".

References

External links 
 
 Wuthering Heights at the Internet Movie Database

1978 films
BBC Film films
Films based on Wuthering Heights
British television miniseries